Joint-Stock Company Permalko is one of the leading distilleries in Perm and Perm Kray. The company is in the top 20 list of vodka and spirits producers in Russia.

History 

On January 1, 1895 the first state distillery in Perm was founded. It was the beginning of state wine trading in Perm Governorate. For some period of time it was operated under the name Winery No. 12.

By February 1900 a state wine warehouse was built nearby (by architect A. B. Turchevitch) (nowadays the building is a monument of architecture of regional significance).

During the revolution of 1917 and the Civil War there was a restrictive policy on the production and sale of alcohol. The order of November 8th, 1917 declared that the production and trading alcohol in the country was prohibited and the plant ceased its activities. The part producing alcohol was closed and the equipment was dismantled.

In 1926 when the newly formed Soviet state started its economic activity the plant recommenced its operation. In Soviet times the plant was renamed into «Perm Spirits Producer».

During the World War II the part of the enterprise was given to the Ukrainian mechanical engineering plant. On October 24th, 1945 the mechanical plant was moved back returned to the Ukraine, main building and a number of service areas were destroyed.

The peak of production was in 1960s — mid1980s when the following vodka brands were delivered: Moskovskaya, Stolichnaya, Russkaya, Posolskaya and others. The assortment included approximately 60 product names among which there were various punches, sweet and semi-sweet liqueurs.

During 1985–1987 an anti-alcohol campaign with partial prohibition, known as the "dry law" was carried out so the plant had to significantly reduce its production

In 1993 as a result of privatization Perm Spirits Producer became a public company and got its current name «Permalko». In those days the plant’s shares mostly belonged to the administration of the Perm region. 

In 2005 the administration announced the privatization of their holdings of shares.

Present Days 
In 2006 the company went private; the majority stake in the company was acquired SPI Group.

In the same year a new bottling house was equipped with Italian and German machines; since September 2007 Permalko has been using the low-temperature technology in alcohol production.

Permalko has a wide sales geography: CIS countries, the USA, Europe and Africa.

All the drinks are based on Lux and Alfa spirits supplied by the distillery of Talvis.

In the production process natural ingredients such as a lemon zest, pine nuts, walnuts, ashberries, cranberries and honey are used. All the products are certified in compliance with the requirements of international standard ISO 22000:2005. Some of vodka brands are covered by the Orthodox Union kosher certificate.

Permalko has been in the top list of the Russian leading liqueur and vodka producers for more than ten years

Awards 
Permalko spirits won international tasting awards in countries such as USA, Hong Kong, Germany, England and France.
 In 2018 vodka Gradus Premium was awarded the grand prix at «Prodexpo-2018» (Moscow); vodkas Permsky Kray (Prodexpo-2018), Gradus Premium, Russky Reserv Myagkaya, Permsky Kray (Best Vodka 2018, Moscow), Gradus Premium, Russky Reserv Myagkaya (Best Product 2018, Moscow) was awarded gold medals, vodka Gradus was awarded four gold medals (The International Spirits Challenge, London; «Meiningers International Spirits Award ISW 2018», Germany; «International Taste and Quality Institute», Brussels; «World Drink Awards», London).
 In 2017 vodka Gradus Premium was awarded grand prix at the contest Best Vodka 2017 and also entered the independent tops of Russian vodka brands; Gradus Premium and Kaznatcheyskaya received medals at the international contest United Vodka 2017. Vodka Gradus was also awarded a silver medal at San Francisco World Spirits Competition and bronze medals at New York International Spirits Competition 2017 and Berlin International Spirits Competition 2017.
 In 2016 the products of Permalko received gold and silver medals, and the grand prix at wine-tasting competition held at Prodexpo International Exhibition.
 In 2015 the products of Permalko received gold and silver medals at Prodexpo Wine-tasting Competition and gold medals in the category Premium at the contest Best Vodka 2015. 
 In 2013 vodka Akula Zolotaya received two gold medals at international wine-testing competitions Prodexpo and Best Vodka 2013; vodka Kaznatcheyskaya was awarded a silver medal at «Internationaler Spiritusen Wettbewerb» (Neustadt).
 In 2011 Permalko products received three gold medals at Russian competition Best Vodka of the Year.

See also

References

External links 

 Permalco.
 Company Overview of Permalko JSC at Bloomberg
 Permalko at Amber Beverage Group.
 ОАО «Пермалко, производственно-торговая компания» at B2B-FMCG.ru. Компании продуктов питания.
 ОАО «Пермалко» at Государственный архив Пермского края.  27.07.2016.
 ОАО «Пермалко» // Путеводитель «Пермский край. Пермь. Ленинский район». Издательство «Маматов», 2016.
 ОАО «Пермалко» // Серия непериодических изданий «Спиртные напитки и пиво». 
 ОАО «Уралалко» и ОАО «Пермалко» // Zavodfoto. Livejournal. 22.02.2012.
 История предприятия «Пермалко» // История Перми. Сообщество Вконтакте.
 Пермалко // Водка Premium. Отраслевой специализированный каталог.
 Пермалко // Пермская торгово-промышленная палата.
 Пермские водки — производства «Уралалко» и «Пермалко» // Пермский форум Teron.ru.

1885 establishments in the Russian Empire
Alcoholic drink companies
Companies based in Perm, Russia
Distilleries in Russia
Drink companies of Russia
Drink companies of the Soviet Union
Food and drink companies established in 1885
Food and drink companies of Russia
Russian brands
Russian vodkas